The Qarabağ 2012–13 season is Qarabağ's 20th Azerbaijan Premier League season, and their fifth season under Gurban Gurbanov. Qarabağ' will also compete in the 2012–13 Azerbaijan Cup.

Squad

 (captain)

Out on loan

Transfers

Summer

In:

 

Out:

Winter

In:

 
 

Out:

Competitions

Friendlies

Azerbaijan Premier League

Results summary

Results by round

Results

League table

Azerbaijan Premier League Championship Group

Results summary

Results by round

Results

Table

Azerbaijan Cup

Squad statistics

Appearances and goals

|-
|colspan="14"|Players who appeared for Qarabağ no longer at the club:

|}

Goal scorers

Disciplinary record

Team kit
These are the 2012–13 Qarabağ kits.

|
|

References
Qarabağ have played their home games at the Tofiq Bahramov Stadium since 1993 due to the ongoing situation in Quzanlı.

External links
 Qarabağ at Soccerway.com

Qarabag
Qarabağ FK seasons